Viiratsi Parish was a rural municipality of Estonia, in Viljandi County.

After the municipal elections held on 20 October 2013, Viiratsi Parish was merged with Paistu, Pärsti and Saarepeedi parishes to form a new Viljandi Parish around the town of Viljandi.

On 1 January 2009, it had a population of 3,743 and an area of 215.02 km2.

Settlements
Small borough
Viiratsi

Villages

References

External links
  

Viiratsi Parish
Geography of Viljandi County